Off the Trolley is a 1919 American short comedy film featuring Harold Lloyd.

Plot
Bebe and Snub are employees on a trolley car.  Harold sneaks the fare from Bebe's coin dispenser to board the vehicle for the purpose of romantically pursuing her.  Among other adventures, Harold ends up helping to foil an armed robbery of the trolley by two bandits.

Cast
 Harold Lloyd 
 Snub Pollard 
 Bebe Daniels  
 Sammy Brooks
 Billy Fay
 Lew Harvey
 Wallace Howe
 Bud Jamison
 Gus Leonard
 Marie Mosquini
 Fred C. Newmeyer
 James Parrott
 Dorothea Wolbert
 Noah Young

See also
 Harold Lloyd filmography

References

External links

1919 films
American silent short films
1919 comedy films
1919 short films
American black-and-white films
Films directed by Alfred J. Goulding
Silent American comedy films
American comedy short films
1910s American films